Segestrioides is a genus of South American coneweb spiders that was first described by Eugen von Keyserling in 1883. Originally placed with the recluse spiders, it was moved to the coneweb spiders in 1983.

Species
 it contains four species:
Segestrioides badia (Simon, 1903) – Brazil
Segestrioides bicolor Keyserling, 1883 (type) – Peru
Segestrioides copiapo Platnick, 1989 – Chile
Segestrioides tofo Platnick, 1989 – Chile

References

Araneomorphae genera
Diguetidae
Spiders of South America
Taxa named by Eugen von Keyserling